Bibilegama Maha Vidyalaya is a government secondary school with a primary school section, located at Hapugastenna, Godakawela Divisional Secretariat of Ratnapura District, Sabaragamuwa Province, Sri Lanka. 

The school  was established in the year 1923, and as of 2011 teaches about 600 pupils with an academic staff of 30 teachers. Advanced Level classes for Arts and Commerce streams are held in Bibilegama MV. The best results of Embilipitiya educational zone, of Advanced Level Examination in Arts stream have been shown by the school, but the main problem facing this school is a shortage of teachers and buildings.

External links
Bibilegama Maha Vidyalaya

Schools in Ratnapura District